Amicalola Falls  is a 729-foot (222 m) waterfall on Amicalola Creek in Dawson County, Georgia, United States.  It the highest waterfall in Georgia and is considered to be one of the Seven Natural Wonders of Georgia.  The name "Amicalola" is derived from a Cherokee language term ama uqwalelvyi, meaning "tumbling waters." The falls are the centerpiece of Amicalola Falls State Park.

Gallery

References

External links

Waterfalls of Georgia (U.S. state)
Seven Natural Wonders of Georgia (U.S. state)
Protected areas of Dawson County, Georgia
Landforms of Dawson County, Georgia